The 2007–08 Vysshaya Liga season was the 16th season of the Vysshaya Liga, the second level of ice hockey in Russia. 30 teams participated in the league. Khimik Voskresensk won the league and was promoted to the Kontinental Hockey League for the 2008–09 season.

First round

Western Conference

Eastern Conference

Playoffs

3rd place 
 (E4) Kazakhmys Satpaev – (W2) Dizel Penza 3:0, 1:3

External links 
 Season on hockeyarchives.info
 Season on hockeyarchives.ru

2007–08 in Russian ice hockey leagues
Rus
Russian Major League seasons